David Watson may refer to:

Politics
 David Watson (New South Wales politician) (1870–1924), Australian Senator
 David Watson (Queensland politician) (born 1945), Australian politician
 David K. Watson (1849–1918), American politician; US Representative from Ohio

Sport
 David Watson (1920s rugby league) (1900–1982), Australian rugby player
 David Watson (coach) (born 1976), American football coach
 David Watson (cricketer) (1919–1943), English cricketer
 David Watson (footballer, born 1946), English footballer of the 1970s and 1980s, played for Sunderland A.F.C.
 David Watson (footballer, born 1973), English football goalkeeper of the 1990s, played for Barnsley F.C.
 David Watson (rugby union) (1854–1906), Scotland international rugby union player
 Dave Watson (born 1961), English footballer of the 1980s and 1990s, played for Everton F.C.
 Dave Watson (American football) (born 1941), professional American football player
 Dave Watson (cyclist) (born 1946), Australian Olympic cyclist
 Dave Watson (ice hockey) (born 1958), retired Canadian professional ice hockey forward
 Dave Watson (racing driver) (born 1945), American racing driver
 Dave Watson (rugby league) (born 1966), New Zealand international of the 1980s and 1990s

Arts and entertainment

 David Watson (actor) (1940–2014), American actor of film, television and theatre
 David Watson (artist) (born 1944), English industrial painter
 David Watson (British musician), record producer, singer and musician
 David Watson (dancer) (born 1968), professional dancer
 David Watson (New Zealand musician) (born 1960), musician and composer from New Zealand
 David R. Watson, alias "Iolo", American bowyer and musician
 Dave Watson (playwright) (–1998), actor and playwright

Other people
 David Watson (academic) (1949–2015), principal of Green Templeton College, Oxford, UK
 David Watson (anarchist) (born 1951), American anarchist author
 David Watson (British Army officer) (–1761), Scottish officer and military engineer
 David Watson (evangelist) (1933–1984), English evangelist and author
 Sir David Watson (general) (1869–1922), Canadian World War I general
 David Watson (psychologist), American psychologist
 David C. C. Watson (1920–2004), English creationist and author
 David Joseph Watson (died 1948), American murderer, executed in Florida
 David M. Watson (born 1973), Australian ornithologist and ecologist
 D. M. S. Watson (1886–1973), British palaeontologist
 David McCloy Watson (1902-1980), Irish accountant
 David Mowat Watson (1891–1972), British civil engineer
 David Paul Watson, botanist, horticulturist and cannabis breeder, founder of Hortapharm B.V.

See also
 David Milne-Watson (1869–1945), Scottish industrialist
 Watson (surname)